Else Streit (born 27 July 1869) was a German composer, pianist, teacher, and violinist.

Streit was born in Lauenburg, Pomerania, on the border of Poland and Germany. She studied music at the Karlsruhe Conservatory and the Stern Conservatory. Her teachers included Heinrich Deeke, Gustav Hollaender, Stephan Krehl and Max Loewengar.

Streit taught violin, piano, and music theory at the Bromberg Conservatory, the Klindworth-Scharwenka Conservatory, and the New Conservatory, Charlottenburg. She also taught privately in Berlin.

Streit's music, in opus numbers through at least 25, was published by Adolf Martin Schlesinger. Her compositions include:

Chamber 

Romance in B minor (violin and piano)
Sonata (violin and piano)

Opera 
St. Nikolaus und seine Gehilfen

Orchestra 

Festmarsch for Infantry
Symphonietta (string orchestra)
Theme and Variations

Vocal 

Drei Lieder, opus 25
"Es war einmal", opus 7
"Psalm" (soprano, violin and organ)
Vier Lieder, opus 21
Vier Lieder, opus 22
"Weihnacht"

References 

German women classical composers
German opera composers
1869 births
Year of death missing